Intafact Beverages Limited is a brewing company based in Onitsha, Anambra State, Nigeria. Since 15 December 2017, it is a subsidiary of International Breweries Plc.

SABMiller made an initial investment of over US$100m in the Onitsha brewery which was commissioned on 30 August 2012. In 2014 a decision was made to invest US$110 million to increase the current annual capacity from 700 000 to 2.1 million hectolitres.

Brands
The brewery produces for brands including Hero Lager, Budweiser, Castle Milk Stout (6%ABV), Grand Malt (non-alcoholic) and Beta Malt (non-alcoholic).

Ownership controversy 2013
A controversy arose in August 2013 about the issue of shares to Next International a company owned by the Anambra state governor Peter Obi. It is also reported that he invested 2 billion Naira of the state money for a 10% stake in the brewery.

See also

 List of beer and breweries in Nigeria

References

Breweries in Nigeria
Companies based in Anambra State
Onitsha
SABMiller
Food and drink companies established in 1971
Nigerian companies established in 1971